Lewis E. Gettle (January 28, 1863 – March 18, 1930) was an American educator, lawyer, and politician.

Born on a farm in Lancaster County, Pennsylvania, Gettle moved with his parents to a farm in Green County, Wisconsin around 1872. Gettle went to Carthage College in Carthage, Illinois and was a teacher and principal of schools in Evansville, Wisconsin, Edgerton, Wisconsin, and Juda, Wisconsin. In 1898, Gettle received his law degree from University of Wisconsin Law School and then practiced law in Edgerton, Wisconsin. While living in Edgerton, Wisconsin, Gettle served on the Rock County, Wisconsin Board of Supervisors and was chairman of the board. He also served on the Edgerton School Board and Library Board and was president of both boards. In 1911, Gettle served in the Wisconsin State Assembly and was a Republican. Later, Gettle worked for Robert M. La Follette, Sr. when he was Governor of Wisconsin. Later, he practiced law in Janesville, Wisconsin and then in 1915, moved to Madison, Wisconsin. In 1921, Gettle was appointed to the Wisconsin Railroad Commission and was chairman of the railroad commission at the time of his death. Gettle died in Madison, Wisconsin.

Notes

1863 births
1930 deaths
People from Lancaster County, Pennsylvania
People from Edgerton, Wisconsin
Politicians from Madison, Wisconsin
Carthage College alumni
University of Wisconsin Law School alumni
Educators from Wisconsin
Farmers from Pennsylvania
Farmers from Wisconsin
Wisconsin Progressives (1924)
20th-century American politicians
School board members in Wisconsin
County supervisors in Wisconsin
Lawyers from Madison, Wisconsin
Educators from Pennsylvania
Republican Party members of the Wisconsin State Assembly